Adolphe Osso (1894–1961) was a French film producer. During the 1920s he was the head of the French branch of Paramount Pictures. Later he founded his own production company Les Films Osso.

Selected filmography
 The Secret of Rosette Lambert (1920)
 The Mystery of the Yellow Room (1930)
 The Eaglet (1931)
 The Unknown Singer (1931)
 The Perfume of the Lady in Black (1931)
 A Son from America (1932)
 Sailor's Song (1932)
 Spring Shower (1932)
 Rail Pirates (1938)
 Goodbye Darling (1946)
 Rue des Saussaies (1951)
 The House on the Dune (1952)
 The Knight of the Night (1953)
 Queen Margot (1954)
 Captain Fracasse (1961)

References

Bibliography
 Phillips, Alastair. City of Darkness, City of Light: Émigré Filmmakers in Paris, 1929-1939. Amsterdam University Press, 2004.

External links

1894 births
1961 deaths
French film producers
People from Safed